There are many characters in the Rambo franchise, although the only two to appear in multiple films are Rambo himself and Colonel Trautman.

Main characters

John James Rambo 

John James Rambo is an iconic titular character and the protagonist of the Rambo franchise. A former Vietnam veteran and highly skilled Green Beret, Rambo returned from the war as a decorated, but disturbed hero. He is filled with self-loathing and hates killing, but is willing to use his skills to protect those close to him. This is the general plot line of the three First Blood sequels. The main character of the series, Rambo appears in all the films. The only character to come close to this is Sam Trautman, his mentor, and commander in Vietnam.

He is played by Sylvester Stallone in the five films and voiced by Neil Ross in the animated series.

Colonel Samuel Richard "Sam" Trautman 

Colonel Samuel Richard "Sam" Trautman is the secondary character in the franchise. He was born on July 6, 1929, in Columbus, Ohio. After graduating from Hilldale High School in his hometown and receiving a B.A. in Sociology from University of Texas in 1950, Trautman joined the United States Army through the ROTC. It is also possible that he enlisted during World War II. After serving in the Korean War, Trautman joined the fledgling Special Forces and was promoted to captain. At the start of the Vietnam War, Trautman began his first combat tour as an adviser to the ARVN. Following his return to the United States, Trautman was selected to form a special forces unit along the lines of S.O.G. It was here that Trautman first met John Rambo, who at that time was a young man who had left both his home and an abusive father. Over the months in training, Trautman became a substitute father for the young Rambo, especially as Rambo was the youngest of the group. When Trautman completed the group's Special Forces training, they were sent on the first of two tours of Vietnam. Trautman's team received the code name of Baker Team and usually consisted of eight men.

The known members of Baker Team were John Rambo, Delmore Barry, Joseph "Joey" Danforth, Manuel "Loco" Ortega, Paul Messner, Delbert Krackhauer, Giuseppe "Greasy Cunt" Colletta, and Ralph Jorgenson. Rambo, Barry, and Trautman are said to be Baker Team's only surviving members from Vietnam, though Barry eventually dies of cancer the summer prior to the events of First Blood.

He is played by Richard Crenna in the first three Rambo films and voiced by Alan Oppenheimer in the animated series.

Introduced in First Blood (1972/1982)

Sheriff William "Will" Teasle 
Sheriff William "Will" Teasle (Brian Dennehy) appears in First Blood. He serves as the main antagonist as well as the sheriff of Hope and strongly dislikes "unwanted elements" in his town, like drifters. Teasle arrests John Rambo for this reason, but Rambo eventually escapes. As the film progresses, Teasle becomes enemies with Rambo. He initially wants to take Rambo alive, but when Art Galt is killed while trying to shoot Rambo, Teasle becomes obsessed with hunting him down and killing him, even after learning that Rambo was a war hero in Vietnam. Teasle later meets Colonel Trautman; the two men seem to respect each other, although they both clearly dislike one another. At the end of the film, Rambo severely injures Teasle and almost kills him before Trautman intervenes and stops him, unlike in the novel, where Teasle and Rambo kill each other. He is last seen being taken into an ambulance, and he is not seen or mentioned again in later films with an exception of a brief flashback during the fourth film.

Deputy Sergeant Arthur "Art" Galt 
Deputy Sergeant Arthur "Art" Galt (Jack Starrett) is Teasle's head deputy, and also his closest friend. He is shown to be very cruel, as he tortures Rambo to the approval of most of the other deputies. He gets beaten up by Rambo as he escapes the police station. Teasle sends him to look for Rambo in a helicopter. Despite Teasle's orders to take him alive, Galt tries to kill him in cold blood as he climbs down from a cliff, threatening to kill the pilot if he does not fly straight so that he can get a clear shot, and ignoring Teasle on his radio. When Rambo is cornered against a tree, he throws a rock at the helicopter's windshield, causing Galt to fall from the helicopter into the gorge, to his death.

Deputy Mitch Rogers 
Deputy Mitch Rogers (David Caruso) is the only deputy in First Blood who is pleasant to Rambo and even shows disgust when Art Galt sadistically tortures Rambo. Upon learning that Rambo was a Green Beret and a Medal of Honor recipient he tries to talk Teasle out of killing Rambo only to be ridiculed by the Sheriff. Eventually he is taken out when Rambo stabs him in the leg during the manhunt, however he clearly didn't feel bad for the injury since he told a fellow deputy that Rambo was being abused by Galt and the other deputies in a failed attempt to talk Teasle out of hunting Rambo.

Introduced in Rambo: First Blood Part II (1985)

Agent Co Phuong Bao 
A native girl named Agent Co Phuong Bao (Julia Nickson) appears in Rambo: First Blood Part II. She works for an intelligence agency. She wants to leave her country, and she arranges for Rambo and herself to go upstream with a group of river pirates. Rambo comes to the camp, and in contradiction to his briefing, he finds US prisoners there and rescues one of them from a makeshift crucifixion.  Later, Co enters the camp, in the guise of a prostitute, and comes to the hut in which Rambo is held captive. Rambo agrees to Podovsky's conditions, but instead threatens Murdock on the radio that he is "coming to get you", then escapes from captivity into a nearby jungle with Co's help. Co then tends to Rambo's wounds and begins to implore him to take her to the United States. Rambo agrees, and they kiss. However, they are then attacked by some Vietnamese soldiers, and Co is killed. Rambo kills them all (except for their commander, who escapes, but is later killed by one of Rambo's exploding arrows) and then buries Co's body in the jungle.

In Rambo III Co Bao's necklace is seen being worn by Rambo for the duration of the film. Rambo eventually gives the necklace to Hamid.

In Rambo: The Force of Freedom, Co Bao was used as the inspiration for Katherine Anne "K.A.T." Taylor (voiced by Mona Marshall), who was also a master of disguise, gymnastics, and martial arts.

Co Bao appears in Rambo via flashbacks. The flashbacks were scenes from the second film.

Major Marshall Roger T. Murdock 
Major Marshall Roger T. Murdock (Charles Napier) is an American bureaucrat and CIA field operative who is in charge of the operation. In Rambo: First Blood Part II, he tells Rambo that the American public is demanding knowledge about the POWs, and they want a trained commando to go in and search for them. Rambo is briefed that he is only to photograph the POWs and not to rescue them, nor is he to engage any enemy soldiers. Rambo reluctantly agrees, and he is then told that an agent of the American government will be there to receive him in the jungles of Vietnam. Murdock claims that he served with the 2nd battalion, 3rd Marines at Kon Tum in 1966, however Rambo realizes this as a lie because the battalion didn't serve in 1966. Later in the film, he betrays Rambo. He turns out to not care about American veterans as he never expected to find any or he assumed Rambo would have been killed rather than complete the mission. In the end, when Rambo returns with the POWs, he confronts Murdock for betraying him, telling him that he knows that there are more POWs left. Rambo then demands Murdock to find them all, or he will kill him for it. It is unknown what happened to Murdock after this.

Michael Reed Ericson 
Michael Reed Ericson (Martin Kove), one of Murdock's associates, is a CIA paramilitary operative and skillful mercenary pilot  who can fly fixed and rotary-winged aircraft equally well. He seems a pleasant character, who attempts to befriend Rambo. When Murdoch orders Rambo's betrayal, he reluctantly complies. When Rambo flies the POWs back to the base, Ericson greets Rambo and congratulates him for surviving, only for Rambo to knock him unconscious with a machine gun over a misunderstanding.

Lifer 
Lifer, another of Murdock's mercenaries, a CIA paramilitary operative (Steve Williams) is a seedy-looking character who, along with Ericson, betrays Rambo on Murdoch's orders. When Trautman argues, Lifer holds a gun to his head. At the end when Rambo returns with the POWs, Lifer hides amongst the Army personnel helping the POWs onto waiting ambulances.

Lieutenant Tay 
Lieutenant Tay is a vicious POW-camp officer played by George Kee Cheung. Tay, who tortures the POWs and Rambo when he is captured, is ultimately killed by Rambo in revenge for the death of Co-Bao.

Captain Vinh 
Captain Vinh, P.O.W. Camp commander. Ends up burned to death in a fire set by Rambo.

Banks 
Banks (Andy Wood) is an American POW who is rescued by Rambo and Co-Bao. He is shocked by how long he has been held captive.

Sergeant Yushin 
Sergeant Yushin is a Russian soldier. He is Podovsky's henchman. He serves as a torturer and electrocutes Rambo to force him to make a radio call. He and Rambo later fight each other in a Soviet helicopter and he is thrown out of the chopper and falls to his death.

Lieutenant Colonel Sergei T. Podovsky 
Lieutenant Colonel Sergei T. Podovsky, a Soviet commander, he is played by Steven Berkoff. He first arrives at the POW camp after Rambo is captured. He and Yushin torture Rambo, and later threaten to torture Banks, to make him radio the Americans that no further rescue attempts should be made for the POWs. When Rambo later destroys the entire camp and frees the POWs, Podovsky chases after them in an attack helicopter. After Rambo's chopper gets damaged in the chase, Rambo tricks the Soviet by pretending to be dead and immobile. When Podovsky flew close enough, Rambo blows him and his helicopter up with a rocket launcher, killing Podovsky and the crew inside.

Introduced in Rambo III (1988)

Colonel Alexei Zaysen 
Colonel Alexei Zaysen (Marc de Jonge) is a Soviet colonel, who has managed to keep his sector of an Afghan province under total control since 1983. He is a ruthless commander of the Soviet garrison in which Colonel Trautman is imprisoned, and is also a veteran combat helicopter pilot. He and his henchman Kourov (Randy Raney) capture Trautman, who Rambo later rescues.he is also killed in an explosion while trying to destroy Rambo

Robert Griggs 

Robert Griggs is the U.S embassy and CIA field operative in Thailand. He is portrayed by Kurtwood Smith. He and Trautman search for John Rambo to recruit him for a supply mission in Afghanistan, which Rambo refuses. While in Afghanistan, Trautman's troops are ambushed by Soviet troops while passing through the mountains at night. Trautman is imprisoned in a Soviet base and coerced for information by Colonel Zaysen (Marc de Jonge) and his henchman Kourov (Randy Raney). Rambo learns of the incident from Griggs and convinces Griggs to take him through an unofficial operation, despite Griggs' warning that the U.S. government will deny any knowledge of his actions if killed or caught (to which Rambo replied, "I'm used to it").

Masoud 
Masoud (Spiros Focás) is a Mujahideen chieftain and village leader, helped Rambo break-in the Soviet fort and free Trautman.

Mousa Ghani 
Mousa Ghani (Sasson Gabai) is a Mujahideen fighter who lives in Peshawar, Pakistan, where he transports medical supplies to the Afghan province immediately over the border. Moussa is enlisted by Griggs to help get Rambo across the border and into the Soviet fort holding Trautman. Although he initially doubts Rambo's abilities, he still leads him inside the fort.

Hamid 
Hamid is a young Afghan orphan whose parents were killed by Soviet troops and aspires to gain revenge by becoming a Mujahideen fighter. Hamid sneaks along when Rambo and Mousa enter the fort, endangering them, when Rambo and himself are wounded, it forces Rambo to give up on the attempt to free Trautman. Rambo later gives Hamid Co-Bao's necklace. Hamid returns with the Mujahideen fighters for the final battle against the Soviet. Hamid asks Rambo if he wants his necklace back in which he says no. Hamid asks Rambo to stay he says he cannot. The two say goodbye.

Sergeant Kourov 
Sergeant Kourov, Colonel Zaysen's henchman. He is a Spetsnaz commando and a large brute. He assists in torturing Trautman and hunting for Rambo. Rambo kills him with a grenade.

Introduced in Rambo (2008)

Michael Burnett 
Michael Burnett (Paul Schulze) is the leader of a church mission attempting to deliver humanitarian aid to a Karen tribe in Burma. He and Sarah were engaged before the events of the film. He and the rest of his group (including Sarah) were captured after Tatmadaw overran the tribal village and killed most of its residents there, causing the church pastor to hire mercenaries and Rambo to mount a rescue. He initially expressed disgust to the visible aspects of war and killing people in general (especially when Rambo kills some Burmese pirates who intended to rape Sarah and kill the rest of them), stating that taking a life was never right. He was eventually able to come to terms with the fact that sometimes even mere survival needs to be fought for. This is shown near the end of the film, when he angrily kills a Tatmadaw soldier by smashing his head with a rock to save a mercenary, an act that left him in shock. He eventually survived the journey and reunites with Sarah.

Sarah Miller 
Sarah Miller (Julie Benz) is a sixth-grade teacher stateside. She is engaged to Michael Burnett (Paul Schulze). An idealist, she managed to persuade a disillusioned Rambo into taking them to Burma and was the only person in the church mission who attempted to start a conversation with him. On the trip to Burma she was discovered to be a woman by Burmese soldiers. Rambo saved her from what otherwise would have been gang rape and sexual slavery. She was taken prisoner by Tatmadaw . Thanks to subsequent efforts by Rambo to throw off Tatmadaw pursuers, and protection rendered by a mercenary called School Boy, she remained free from re-captivity upon the rescue mission's completion. After the climactic battle, she reunited with Michael.

Lewis 
Lewis (Graham McTavish) is one of the mercenaries hired to retrieve the Christian missionaries abducted by the Tatmadaw. A former SAS with rudeness streak. He states he does mercenary work to pay off his ex-wife's alimony and child support for his 3 children. Although he constantly bickered with everyone and was stubborn, he did prove to be a big asset to getting the missionaries back. He survived the battle, but was injured and being attended by Michael and the Rebels.

School Boy 
School Boy (Matthew Marsden) is a young British mercenary and ex-SBS sniper who turns out to be more personable than the rest of the group. His skills with a Barrett M82CQ - 50 BMG sniper rifle were demonstrated when, during the covert assault on the Tatmadaw camp where the captured missionaries were held, he eliminated multiple sentries to keep the escape route open. When Rambo separated from the group to locate Sarah, he volunteered to wait for him while the rest of the group made their escape; this proved to be a fortunate decision, as his sniper rifle saved Rambo and Sarah from being killed by a Tatmadaw patrol. He was later entrusted with Sarah's safety, when Rambo took a series of actions to disrupt Tatmadaw's attempt to hunt them down. He and Sarah remained undetected by Tatmadaw troops upon Tatmadaw's defeat (indeed in part because of Rambo's efforts).

Reese 
Reese (Jake La Botz), nicknamed Tombstone, is one of the fellow mercenaries (and the only American) hired to recover the Christian missionaries abducted by the Tatmadaw. It is implied that he is former United States Army; his arms are covered in tattoos and he was wearing a camouflaged vest, speaks with a Southern accent and called himself "just some grunt". He also wields an M4A1 carbine with an M203 grenade launcher. Reese annoyed everyone, especially Lewis, by singing the song "The Wishing Well". It is believed that Reese survived the final gunfight but he was left severely injured and lying amidst the wreckage with Lewis. He is on his knees looking up by Lewis.

En-Joo 
En-Joo (Tim Kang) is one of the fellow mercenaries hired to recover the Christian missionaries abducted by the Tatmadaw. He was killed when Tatmadaw soldier tossed at grenade despite Lewis's efforts to stop that soldier. He was armed with Sig 552 Commando carbine.

Diaz 
Diaz (Rey Gallegos) is one of the fellow mercenaries hired to recover the Christian missionaries abducted by the Tatmadaw. A soldier with a framethrower on the boat hit Diaz and he was burned badly. It was likely he was killed as the result of it. He armed himself with DSA SA58.

Major Pa Tee Tint 
Major Pa Tee Tint (Maung Maung Khin) is a Burmanese major and a primary antagonist of Rambo.

Myint 
Myint is from the rebels provided guides for the mercenary group sent to rescue the captured missionaries. These guides, along with Rambo, ended up improvising a disguise as a truck-borne patrol for infiltrating the Tatmadaw base where the missionaries were held and tortured. During the climactic battle near the end of the film, the Karen rebels participated en masse to help turn the tide in favor of the mercenaries.

R. Rambo 
R. Rambo, is the name found on a mailbox at the end of the movie Rambo. In an earlier scene, Sarah asks Rambo if he had any family back home. Rambo says that he thinks maybe his father is still alive. R. Rambo is presumably his father.

Introduced in Rambo: Last Blood (2019)

Maria Beltran 
Maria Beltran (Adriana Barraza) has been described as someone who is "like a sister" to Rambo and has worked on Rambo's father's farm all her life. Maria has a granddaughter Gabriela who helps her out on the farm. Gabriela is a nursing student.

Carmen Delgado 
Carmen Delgado (Paz Vega) is an independent reporter covering the drug trade in Mexico. She aids Rambo after her younger half-sister was kidnapped and killed by a Mexican cartel.

Hugo Martinez 
Hugo Martinez (Sergio Peris-Mencheta) is the leader of a Mexican cartel and the main antagonist of Rambo: Last Blood.

Victor Martinez 
Victor Martinez (Óscar Jaenada) is the co-leader of a Mexican cartel along with his brother Hugo and the secondary antagonist of Rambo: Last Blood.

Gabriela Beltran 
Gabriela Beltran (Yvette Monreal) is Rambo's surrogate niece who was kidnapped by a drug cartel in Mexico. Rambo treats her like one of the family. Gabriela is a nursing student who went to Mexico to find her estranged father and why he left her.

Introduced in Rambo: The Force of Freedom (1986)

Force of Freedom 
 Edward "Turbo" Hayes (voiced by James Avery) - An African-American mechanical engineer and race car driver. According to his toy bio, Turbo is also a First Lieutenant who graduated from the US Air Force Academy.
 White Dragon (voiced by Robert Ito) - A heroic ninja who is Black Dragon's twin brother. According to his toy bio, White Dragon had also developed a ninja training program for the U.S. military.
 T.D. "Touchdown" Jackson (voiced by George DiCenzo) - A former football player and ally of Rambo. He joined the Force of Freedom at the time when Mad Dog's gang forces elderly couples out of their homes as part of General Warhawk's plot to dig into a military base and steal a top secret new supertank in "Blockbuster".
 Chief (voiced by Alan Oppenheimer) - A Native American ally of Rambo. He joined the Force of Freedom after he rescued his friends in the swamp and from S.A.V.A.G.E. following the plane crash and helped prevent General Warhawk from burying the gold in the sacred grounds on Spirit Island (where the graves of Chief's forefathers are located) in "Skyjacked Gold".

S.A.V.A.G.E. 
S.A.V.A.G.E. stands for Specialist-Administrators of Vengeance, Anarchy and Global Extortion. They always have goals for world domination until they end up fighting the Force of Freedom. In addition to a substantial number of soldiers, among the members of S.A.V.A.G.E. are:

 General Warhawk (voiced by Michael Ansara) - The reflective sunglasses-wearing leader of S.A.V.A.G.E. who serves as the primary antagonist of the series. General Warhawk was previously a European army captain (possibly West Germany) who was convicted of selling state secrets and deported for his coup. He then organized and built S.A.V.A.G.E.
 Sergeant Havoc (voiced by Peter Cullen) - General Warhawk's second-in-command and top enforcer. He has strength that rivals Rambo's strength. Sergeant Havoc was previously a drill sergeant for the free world. After being court-martialed for spying, he joined up with S.A.V.A.G.E.
 Gripper (voiced by Lennie Weinrib) - A European mercenary and member of S.A.V.A.G.E with a metal right hand (hence the name) that wears an eyepatch. He was a former member of the French Foreign Legion until he was dismissed after failing to recognize the surrender flag and joined S.A.V.A.G.E.
 Nomad (voiced by Edmund Gilbert) - A burnoose-wearing Middle-Eastern member of S.A.V.A.G.E. He was a wandering nomadic warrior that calls no country his home. Nomad leads a group of outcasts which consists of cutthroats and thieves.
 Mad Dog (voiced by Frank Welker) - The leader of an unnamed biker gang and member of S.A.V.A.G.E. who sports a mohawk and a S.A.V.A.G.E. logo tattoo on his chest. He is first called Spike in the episode "Battlefield Bronx," but renamed Mad Dog in all subsequent episodes. According to his toy bio, Mad Dog was found unfit for military services and has an extended criminal record for theft, reckless driving, and arson.
 Animal - Member of Mad Dog's biker gang.
 Jerkface (voiced by Lennie Weinrib) - Member of Mad Dog's biker gang.
 Razor (voiced by Peter Cullen) - Member of Mad Dog's biker gang.
 Black Dragon (voiced by Robert Ito) - A rogue ninja who is the twin brother of White Dragon. He is known as the greatest assassin that ever lived. Black Dragon would sell his service to any group that would pay his fee with his recurring clients being S.A.V.A.G.E. He sometimes has other ninjas under his command when assisting S.A.V.A.G.E. in some of their plots. Black Dragon's ultimate goal is to kill White Dragon. Primarily, he also considers Rambo as a worthy opponent.
 Snakebite (voiced by Peter Cullen) - A member of S.A.V.A.G.E. who was born and raised in the Okeefenokee Swamp and likes wild animals like venomous snakes, insects, and black rats which he carries in his Beast Pack.
 Dr. Hyde (voiced by Edmund Gilbert) - A cybernetic mad scientist and member of S.A.V.A.G.E. whose head is in a dome-shaped helmet. According to General Warhawk in the episode "Robot Raid," he and X-Ray were thought to be long dead, but became mad geniuses.
 X-Ray (voiced by James Avery) - Dr. Hyde's cybernetic henchman. Along with Dr. Hyde, he was also thought to be long dead and became a mad genius in his own right.
 Max (voiced by Lennie Weinrib) - Dr. Hyde's android henchman and enforcer who was created by Dr. Hyde and X-Ray.

There were also some one-shot characters who were members of S.A.V.A.G.E. that appeared in one episode where a few of them appeared more than once. The following are listed in order of appearance:

 Admiral Nomak (voiced by Lennie Weinrib) - An admiral who assisted General Warhawk twice. First, he helped General Warhawk in "Raise the Yamato" in a plot to raise the Yamato Battleship in order to take over Tierra Libre. He then appears in "Pirate Peril" along with Captain Scar assisting General Warhawk in a plot to raise the French submarine Liberte off the coast of Hong Kong.
 Count (voiced by Alan Oppenheimer) - A descendant of Vlad III the Impaler who worked with General Warhawk on two occasions. The first time was when it involved capturing Nobel Prize–winning physicist Herbert Kensington in "Deadly Keep." The second time was when he helped General Warhawk in a plot to capture the President of the United States in "Return of the Count."
 Rama (voiced by Dale Ishimoto) - The leader of the Cult of the Cobra. He only appeared in "Cult of the Cobra" where he and his group helped General Warhawk in halting the food shipments to the Indian Province of Assam in a plot to force the people of Assam to make General Warhawk their dictator.
 Pandora (voiced by Mona Marshall) - A female panther trainer working for General Warhawk. She only appears in "Raid on Las Vegas" where she assisted in a plot to rob the Las Vegas casinos.
 Sheik Hassat (voiced by Lennie Weinrib) - A sheik who assisted General Warhawk in a plot to blow up the shipping businesses on the Suez Canal.
 Mike Flynn (voiced by Alan Oppenheimer) - An old friend of Rambo's who ended up stealing the XK-7 fighter jet and used it to assist General Warhawk in enslaving the Zimboli people to mine diamonds for him.
 Varinia (voiced by Mona Marshall) - A female operative of S.A.V.A.G.E. Only appearing in "Fire in the Sky", she assisted General Warhawk, Sergeant Havoc, Gripper, and Nomad in stealing a nuclear-armed submarine called the USS Typhoon and plans to auction it to any terrorist that is interested in it.
 Captain Scar (voiced by Peter Cullen) - A pirate captain who assisted General Warhawk in a plot to raise the French submarine Liberte off the coast of Hong Kong.
 Mephisto (voiced by Frank Welker) - A magician who assisted General Warhawk in a plot to steal the Washington Monument.
 Mombo Igthayan (voiced by Mona Marshall) - A Haitian Voodoo magician who assisted General Warhawk in a plot to enslave the Haitians and mine the island.
 Dr. Blackburn (voiced by Peter Cullen) - A scientist who assisted General Warhawk in a plot to use a mind-control box on a killer whale named Korac and attack the NORAD Bases.
 Iron Mask (voiced by Peter Cullen) - A criminal in an iron mask who assisted General Warhawk in a plot to locate an old war plane containing a fortune of gold. Later, he was revealed by Rambo to be the crooked Major Murphy who took over a Military base in Munich during the Oktoberfest.

References 

Rambo (franchise)
Rambo